Proposition 2½ is a Massachusetts statute that limits property tax assessments and, secondarily, automobile excise tax levies by Massachusetts municipalities. The name of the initiative refers to the 2.5% ceiling on total property taxes annually as well as the 2.5% limit on property tax increases. It was passed by ballot measure, specifically called an initiative petition within Massachusetts state law for any form of referendum voting, in 1980 and went into effect in 1982.  The effort to enact the proposition was led by the anti-tax group Citizens for Limited Taxation. It is similar to other "tax revolt" measures passed around the same time in other parts of the United States. This particular proposition followed the movements of states such as California.

Voting
Proposition 2½ appeared with five other initiatives presented to Massachusetts voters on November 4, 1980. It was question 2 on the ballot, "Limiting local taxes (Proposition 2 1/2)".

Source:

Real and personal property taxes   

Under Proposition 2½, a municipality is subject to two property tax limits:
 Ceiling: The total annual property tax revenue raised by a municipality shall not exceed 2.5% of the assessed value of all taxable property contained in it.
 Increase limit: The annual increase of property tax cannot exceed 2.5%, plus the amount attributable to taxes that are from new real property.

These limits refer to the entire amount of the annual tax levy raised by a municipality.  The property taxes are the sum of: (a) residential real property; (b) commercial real property; (c) industrial real property; and (d) business-owned personal property. In practice, it usually limits the tax bills of individual taxpayers, but only as an indirect result. The limits for each community are calculated by the Massachusetts Department of Revenue.

A side effect of Proposition 2½ is that municipality income will decline in real terms whenever inflation rises above 2.5%. Historically inflation has been above 2.5% for a significant majority of the years since 1980 (22 out of the 28 years to date), thus resulting in a real decline in local tax rates and local spending ability.

An exception allows the citizens of each municipality to override the 2½ restriction to address specific needs of the community thus giving the citizens direct control over their taxation.

Vehicle excise tax
The excise tax for automobiles registered in Massachusetts was also lowered by Proposition 2½.  Previously, this tax was levied at a rate of $66.00 per $1,000 of car valuation (6.6%). Proposition 2½ lowered this rate to $25.00 per $1,000 of car valuation, resulting in a 2½ per cent excise tax rate, but can still increase 264%, to the previous 6.6% tax rate if a Proposition 2½ operational override (see below) is approved by ballot in a community during a general (or special referendum) election.

Exclusions
Proposition 2½ excludes four cases from the limitation on tax levy increases:

 "New growth": The Act allows for new growth.  So, for example, when a new house is built, the tax levy may increase by the amount of taxes collected from that house.

And three types of exclusions granted by the majority those voting in a municipal referendum:

 "Capital exclusion": Capital expenditure for the upcoming fiscal year;
 "Debt exclusion": For pre-1980 municipal debt or new debt issued for a designated purpose (e.g. bonds issued for a multi-year capital expense); or
 Water/sewer debt: For certain water and sewer system debt.

Overrides and underrides
Municipalities may exceed or reduce the limits with the prior approval of the majority those voting in a municipal referendum to:
 "Operational override": Override the increase limit.
 "Underride": The levy limit is reduced.  Such a vote can be started by the Massachusetts initiative petition procedure, or the municipal legislature.

The proposition originally required a two-thirds majority for passage of overrides, but the state legislature changed this to a simple majority in 1981.

General consensus
A professional survey firm conducted half-hour phone interviews in 58 randomly selected cities in Massachusetts where 1,561 household heads answer questions about Proposition 2½. The results of the interview concluded that the people of Massachusetts thought that Proposition 2½ would lead to a more responsible government, more efficiency in local government, and more voter control over schools. The people also thought that public sector jobs would become riskier. Some feared for the loss of their jobs or the decline in quality of them. Another thing people expected were effects on clusters of services. The peoples' household services were feared to be changed greatly. The people of Massachusetts desired spending and taxing by state government, local government, and local public schools more than other places to spend tax dollars. Many people expected Proposition 2½ to lead to welfare reductions. Finally, analysis of the survey shows that voters who expected welfare to be cut back were more likely to support Proposition 2½.

Results
Following the mandating of actual revenue reductions within the first couple of years, the effects and results of Proposition 2½ were limited.  The lack of significant changes was due in part to the state government increasing general purpose aid to municipalities, which helped them to stay away from budget shortfalls.  Effective property tax rates declining and an increase in community taxes were a result of various factors including a 64% increase in real estate aid to municipalities between 1981 and 1988, declining school expenses, and a region wide real estate boom. Reduced revenues in the 1980s caused the state to reduce local aid, which fell 12% in 1990, along with over 30% between 1989–1992.  Over time, Proposition 2½ would have become more binding due to the fact that it is operated in nominal terms, meaning that the rules it follows do not change in response to prices, costs, or spending.

Overrides and underrides 

, municipalities had requested, via referendum, 4,449 overrides of Proposition 2½, of which 1,798 passed; 16 underrides were requested, of which nine passed.

See also
 Proposition 13, the California tax limitation law that inspired the passage of Proposition 2½.
 Colorado Taxpayer Bill of Rights

References

Further reading
  (editorial position)

External links
Levy Limits: A Primer on Proposition 2½ from Massachusetts Dept. of Revenue, Division of Local Services
 

1980 in the United States
Initiatives in the United States
1980 Massachusetts ballot measures
Massachusetts statutes
Taxation in Massachusetts